Gypsy is an unincorporated community in St. John the Baptist and St. Charles parishes, in the U.S. state of Louisiana, located on the east bank of the Mississippi River.

History
Gypsy took its name from Gypsy Plantation, a private estate, which in turn was likely named for the Romani entertainers who would come to river towns looking for work.

References

Romani in the United States
Unincorporated communities in St. Charles Parish, Louisiana
Unincorporated communities in St. John the Baptist Parish, Louisiana
Unincorporated communities in Louisiana